Andong Science College is a small technical college in Seohu-myeon, Andong City, North Gyeongsang province, South Korea. It employs about 75 full-time instructors. Academic departments include nursing, public health administration, cyber-terror defense, physical therapy, dental hygiene, computer information, information management, and medical engineering. The campus covers 129,000 m² and includes a library and gymnasium. The school maintains sister relationships with Ashland University in the United States, and domestically with Kyung Hee University.

History
Unlike most technical colleges in South Korea, it began its existence as a public institution, Andong Nursing High School (안동간호고등기술학교), which was founded in 1967. The school was redesignated a technical school in 1972. In 1983, it was officially taken over by a private organization, the Jangchun Educational Foundation (학교법인 장춘학원), and was known as Andong Technical College of Health and Nursing. It became a general technical college in 1992. The school took on its current name, Andong Science College, in 1998.

In the fall of 1997, the Department of Tourism English began using native English speakers to augment their English programs. The students eventually worked in the travel industry across South Korea.

At that time the department hired Brian Curneal and Christopher Brogan of Lansing, MI to teach ESL and Conversational English. Both teachers began teaching Conversational English to Elementary school teachers. Later in the spring of 1997 Mr. Curneal and Mr. Brogan began teaching the college freshmen and sophomores conversational English in earnest. They both continued teaching at Angong Junior College, the common English name for the school, until the end of the second semester (fall) of 1997. During their short tenure there they also taught conversational English to many of the school's instructors and professors.

See also
Education in South Korea
List of colleges and universities in South Korea

External links
Official school website, in Korean and Chinese

Vocational education in South Korea
Nursing schools in South Korea
Universities and colleges in North Gyeongsang Province
Andong
Educational institutions established in 1967
1967 establishments in South Korea